Sidney "Sid" Bobb (born January 10, 1980) is a Canadian actor and television presenter. He is the co-artistic director at Aanmitaagzi in North Bay, Ontario and an instructor at the Centre for Indigenous Theatre. From 2007 to 2016, he, along with Patty Sullivan, hosted the programming block Kids' CBC.

He is the son of indigenous author Lee Maracle and brother to the actress Columpa Bobb.

Filmography

Film
 Song of Hiawatha (1997) - Young Huron Warrior

Television
 Canada: A People's History (2000) - Taignoagny (Season 1, Episode 1 "When the World Began")
 Relic Hunter (2002) - Shaman (Season 3, Episode 13 "Fire in the Sky"); Anasazi Man (Season 3, Episode 16 "Under the Ice")
 Kids' CBC (2007-2016) - Host
 Hard Rock Medical (2018) - Fergus (Episodes "White Coats" and "Too Close for Comfort")

References

Living people
Canadian children's television personalities
CBC Television people
1980 births